Manuel Vicentini (born August 29, 1990), is an Argentine professional footballer who plays as a goalkeeper who plays for Belgrano, on loan from Sarmiento.

References

External links

1990 births
Argentine people of Italian descent
Association football goalkeepers
Argentine footballers
Boca Juniors footballers
Club Atlético Sarmiento footballers
Club Atlético Belgrano footballers
Argentine Primera División players
Primera Nacional players
Living people